A Handful of Stars may refer to:

A Handful of Stars, a play by Billy Roche, part of The Wexford Trilogy
"A Handful of Stars", a popular song by Jack Lawrence, recorded by Johnny Mathis and others
A Handful of Stars, a 2005 album by jazz musician Aaron Weinstein

See also
Handful of Stars, a 2010 album by Ukrainian black metal band Drudkh